QS Aquilae is a triple or quadruple star system consisting of an eclipsing binary in a 2.5 day orbit around which a third star orbits in 77 years. There is some indication that there is a fourth component with a period of roughly 18 years. It is located in the constellation Aquila and is barely visible to the naked eye.

References

Aquila (constellation)
185936
Spectroscopic binaries
Algol variables
Eclipsing binaries
Aquilae, QS
7846
B-type main-sequence stars
096840
Durchmusterung objects